Sri Lankan nationality law details the conditions in which a person is a national of Sri Lanka. The primary law governing nationality regulations is the Citizenship Act, which came into force on 15 November 1948.

Any person born in Sri Lanka to a Sri Lankan parent is automatically a citizen by descent. Individuals born outside the country to a Sri Lankan parent are subject to an additional registration requirement at a Sri Lankan diplomatic mission. Foreign nationals who have Sri Lankan ancestry or are married to a Sri Lankan spouse may acquire citizenship by registration. Any other foreigner who holds a residence visa valid for at least five years and have been admitted into the Resident Guest Scheme by the government may also acquire citizenship by registration.

Sri Lanka was previously a colony of the British Empire and local residents were British subjects. Although Sri Lanka gained independence in 1948 and Sri Lankans no longer hold British nationality, they continue to have favoured status when residing in the United Kingdom; as Commonwealth citizens, Sri Lankans are eligible to vote in UK elections and serve in public office there.

Acquisition and loss of citizenship 

All persons born in Sri Lanka receive citizenship by descent if at least one parent is a citizen. Children born overseas to a Sri Lankan parent may acquire citizenship by descent if they are registered at a Sri Lankan diplomatic mission. Foreign nationals with Sri Lankan ancestry or are married to a Sri Lankan spouse may become citizens by registration. All other foreigners who hold a residence visa valid for at least five years and have been accepted by the government into the Resident Guest Scheme may also acquire citizenship by registration.

Sri Lankan citizenship can be voluntarily relinquished by making a declaration of renunciation. Sri Lankan citizens who become citizens of another country automatically have their citizenship revoked unless they first obtain government permission allowing them to retain Sri Lankan citizenship. Otherwise, former Sri Lankans may subsequently apply for citizenship resumption. Dual citizens are prohibited from standing for office in Parliament and are ineligible to become President.

References

Citations

Sources

Publications 

 

Nationality law
Law of Sri Lanka